The 1980 Vuelta a España was the 35th edition of the Vuelta a España, one of cycling's Grand Tours. The Vuelta began in La Manga, with a prologue individual time trial on 22 April, and Stage 10 occurred on 2 May with a stage to Santander. The race finished in Madrid on 11 May.

Prologue
22 April 1980 — La Manga to La Manga,  (ITT)

Stage 1
23 April 1980 — La Manga to Benidorm,

Stage 2
24 April 1980 — Benidorm to Cullera,

Stage 3
25 April 1980 — Cullera to Vinaròs,

Stage 4
26 April 1980 — Vinaròs to Sant Quirze del Vallès,

Stage 5
27 April 1980 — Sant Quirze del Vallès to La Seu d'Urgell,

Stage 6
28 April 1980 — La Seu d'Urgell to Viella,

Stage 7
29 April 1980 — Viella to Jaca,

Stage 8
30 April 1980 — Monastery of Leyre to Logroño,

Stage 9
1 May 1980 — Logroño to Burgos,

Stage 10
2 May 1980 — Burgos to Santander,

References

1980 Vuelta a España
Vuelta a España stages